Class 465 may refer to:

British Rail Class 465
Cercanias Class 463 & 465